Justin Wyatt (born January 27, 1984) is an American football cornerback who was expected to be drafted in the 2006 NFL Draft but went undrafted.

Football experience

Professional career
The National Football League Arizona Cardinals picked him up as a free agent.

College career
Wyatt graduated from the University of Southern California.  He was a Pac-10 honorobale mention player.

High school career
Wyatt attended Dominguez High School in Compton, California.

External links
USC Trojans bio

1984 births
American football cornerbacks
Arizona Cardinals players
Living people
USC Trojans football players